Austromartyria porphyrodes is a moth of the family Micropterigidae. It is only known to be from the higher rainfall regions of the Atherton Tableland in northern Queensland.

The forewing length is 3.5 mm for males and 4 mm for females. The forewing ground colour is rich purplish-brown with strong reflections. It has three transverse shining white fasciae, the first small and basal but with a row of black scales along the costal and anal margins. The second is found at slightly less than mid-length and has the form of a broad straight band from the costa to the dorsum. It is slightly wider at the dorsum end and fringed with black scales along the costal margin. The third is found midway between the second fascia and the apex. The fringes are dark brown. The hindwings are dark brownish-black with purple reflections.

References

Micropterigidae
Moths described in 1932
Moths of Australia